The New Providence Presbyterian Church near Salvisa, Kentucky is a historic Greek Revival-style church built between 1862 and 1865.  It was added to the National Register of Historic Places in 1975.

The church is one of the oldest Presbyterian churches in Kentucky.  It was organized in 1785 and was one of the founding churches of the Transylvania Presbytery in 1786.

References

External links

Presbyterian churches in Kentucky
Churches on the National Register of Historic Places in Kentucky
Churches completed in 1865
Churches in Mercer County, Kentucky
1865 establishments in Kentucky
National Register of Historic Places in Mercer County, Kentucky